Diocese of Ahmedabad may refer to:

 Ahmedabad Orthodox Diocese
 Roman Catholic Diocese of Ahmedabad